Gilbert Peterson (August 5, 1824 - November 14, 1890), was an American contractor from Lockport, New York. He was the founder and President of Peterson & Sons, which he ran with his two sons, Charles Gilbert Peterson and Jesse Peterson. The company executed contracts building the waterworks of Toledo, Ohio; Grand Rapids, Michigan; Milwaukee, Wisconsin; part of the Genesee Valley Canal Railroad and worked on multiple reservoirs in the Washington, D.C., area. Previously he was a partner at Hunt, Peterson & Kinsley, responsible for enlarging Erie Canal between Middleport, New York, and Gasport, New York, in 1855, and canal repairs in Albany, New York, Frankfort, New York, and Kilburn Hill, New York. Peterson was superintendent of both the eastern and western divisions of the Erie Canal, and in 1867–1868 he was alderman of the 2nd Ward of Lockport, New York.

He is the great grandfather of Charles Sterling Bunnell.

References

19th-century American businesspeople
1824 births
1890 deaths
New York (state) city council members
People from Mount Morris, New York
Politicians from Lockport, New York
19th-century American politicians